Agricultural expansion describes the growth of agricultural land (arable land, pastures, etc.) especially in the 20th and 21st centuries.

The agricultural expansion is often explained as a direct consequence of the global increase in food and energy requirements due to continuing population growth (both which in turn have been attributed to agricultural expansion itself), with an estimated expectation of 10 to 11 billion humans on Earth by end of this century. It is foreseen that most of the world's non-agrarian ecosystems (terrestrial and aquatic) will be affected adversely, from habitat loss, land degradation, overexploitation, and other problems. The intensified food (and biofuel) production will in particular affect the tropical regions.

Most modern agriculture relies on intensive methods. Further expansion of the predominant farming types that rest on a small number of highly productive crops has led to a significant loss of biodiversity on a global scale already.
Moreover, agricultural expansion continues to be the main driver of deforestation and forest fragmentation. Large-scale commercial agriculture (primarily cattle ranching and cultivation of soya bean and oil palm) accounted for 40 percent of tropical deforestation between 2000 and 2010, and local subsistence agriculture for another 33 percent. In the light of the already occurring and potential massive ecological effects, the need for sustainable practices is more urgent than ever.

At the same time, arable land use in developed countries is likely to continue its decline.

A well-known example of already ongoing agricultural expansion is the proliferation of palm oil production areas or the land conversion/deforestation for soy bean production in South America. Today's land grabbing activities are often a consequence of the strive for agricultural land by growing economies.

In the beginning of the 21st century the palm oil industry caused a massive deforestation in Borneo with heavy consequences.

See also
Industrial agriculture
Green revolution
Environmental impact of agriculture
Meat consumption
Overexploitation
Biodiversity loss
Carbon sink
Deforestation
Land sparing
Species extinctions
Jevons paradox
Social and environmental impact of palm oil
Land use, land-use change, and forestry

References

Sources

Further reading

Agriculture